Jamari Traylor (born June 24, 1992) is an American professional basketball player who last played for the Oklahoma City Blue of the  NBA G League. Standing at 2.03 m (6'8"), he plays the power forward and the center positions. Traylor played college basketball at Kansas.

High school career
Traylor played high school basketball at IMG Academy.

College career
As a freshman Traylor played 37 games, producing 2 points and 2 rebounds per game with a total of 28 blocks. As a sophomore Traylor played in 34 contests, and improved his numbers, averaging 4.8 points, 4.1 rebounds and 0.8 blocks per game, improving his playing time to 16.1 minutes per game. During the next two years, his numbers continued to drop. He became known for being a hard-nosed defender and hustle type player.

Professional career
After going undrafted in the 2016 NBA draft, Traylor joined Oberwart Gunners of the Austria League. During the season, Traylor was the top rebounder and led the league in blocks.

On June 22, 2017, Traylor joined Kymis of the Greek Basket League. He joined the Hiroshima Dragonflies in 2018.

Oklahoma City Blue (2022)
On January 8, 2022, Traylor was acquired off waivers by the Oklahoma City Blue. He was then later waived on January 18, 2022.

Personal life
He was arrested September 27, 2020 for his alleged involvement in smuggling marijuana into Japan. The charges were later dismissed.

References

External links
Kansas Jayhawks bio
Eurobasket.com Profile
NBAdraft Profile

1992 births
Living people
American expatriate basketball people in Austria
American expatriate basketball people in Greece
American expatriate basketball people in Japan
American men's basketball players
Basketball players from Chicago
Centers (basketball)
Hiroshima Dragonflies players
Kansas Jayhawks men's basketball players
Kymis B.C. players
Power forwards (basketball)
Universiade gold medalists for the United States
Universiade medalists in basketball
Medalists at the 2015 Summer Universiade